AATC may refer to:

 Arrive Alive Traffic Control, a Barricade Rental Company located in Florida
 Alvin and the Chipmunks, an American animated music group
 Anglo-Argentine Tramways Company, a defunct Argentine transport company
 Asian American Theater Company, a non-profit theatre performance company
 Australian Army Transportation Corps, military unit, Australia